SanPa: Sins of the Savior is a 2020 docuseries directed by Cosima Spender, developed by Gianluca Neri and produced by Gianluca Neri and Nicola Allieta, starring Vincenzo Andreucci, Antonio Boschini and Fabio Cantelli.  The series documents the work of Vincenzo Muccioli, who cared for addicts during a heroin crisis, and the controversies that arose from his work.

Cast
 Vincenzo Andreucci
 Antonio Boschini
 Fabio Cantelli
 Walter Delogu
 Antonella De Stefani
 Andrea Muccioli
 Luciano Nigro
 Fabio Mini
 Paolo Negri
 Red Ronnie
 Angelo Battistini
 Leonardo Montecchi
 Pier Andrea Muccioli
 Sergio Pierini
 Sebastiano Berla
 Andrea Delogu
 Nicolò Licata
 Giuseppe Maranzano
 Paolo Severi
 Sebastiano Berla
 Rita Maranzano

Episodes

Release
SanPa: Sins of the Savior was released on December 30, 2020, on Netflix.

References

External links
 
 

2020 Italian television series debuts
2020 Italian television series endings
2020s documentary television series
Italian-language Netflix original programming
Netflix original documentary television series
Television shows about drugs
Works about heroin
Works about addiction